Anne Lockhart may refer to:

Anne Lockhart (actress) (born 1953), American actress
Anne Lockhart of Tarbrax, daughter of Sir James Lockhart of Lee
Anne Lockhart, Countess of Aberdeen (died 1707), daughter of the above